His Imperial Majesty's Retinue, His Imperial Majesty's Suite (abbr.

The aides to the Tsar were routinely assigned honorary title of Adjutant; it was used in parallel with existing personal military, court or civil rank as defined in the Table of Ranks. Anna of Russia was the first Sovereign who assigned an Adjutant General as her personal military aide in the rank of General-Poruchik (Lieutenant General). Since 1775, Pavel I additionally honored a handful of his Guards officers (in an equivalent of Colonel ranks) with a Fliegel Adjutant (флигель-адъютант), an equivalent of Aide-de-camp.

Nicholas I formally created the Suite in 1827 and introduced a title of Major General of the H.I.M. Suite. In 1841, a special title of Ajdutant General of the Emperor's Person was created.

However, military units might have been awarded the honourable title «His Imperial Majesty's Suit», e.g. Siberian 1st of «His Imperial Majesty's Suit» infantry regiment — one of the Imperial Russian Army's regiments in East Siberia. 
Military of the Russian Empire
1917 disestablishments in Russia